Stepney Power Station (sometimes known as Limehouse Power Station) was a small coal-fired power station situated by the Thames on the north side of Narrow Street, Limehouse, London.

History
Stepney Borough Council began construction of the station at Blyth Wharf in 1907. A coaling jetty was built in 1923. The station supplied the boroughs of Stepney and Bethnal Green.

New generating equipment was added as the demand for electricity increased. The generating capacity, maximum load, and electricity generated and sold was as follows:

In 1923 the plant comprised one 1,500 kW, one 2,000 kW, two 5,000 kW, and one 10,000 kW turbo alternators, totalling 23,500 kW. The surplus of revenue over expenses in 1923 was £129,659.

Following pollution problems from the original chimneys a single tall brick chimney was constructed in 1937, dominating the area. In 1956 it was reported that the first Brown-Riley coal pulveriser had been installed at Stepney power station and having been in operation for some time was working with satisfactory results. At this time the equipment comprised: 1 × 34 MW Fraser & Chalmers-GEC; 1 × 19 MW Escher-Wyss-Oerlikon; 1 × 6.25 MW Escher-Wyss-Brown-Bovery; and 2 × 12.5 MW Metro-Vickers turbo-alternators.

During its final decade of operation the station comprised a single 34 MW generator. This was supplied with steam at a range of pressures and temperatures: 180/350 psi (12.4/24.1 bar) at 299/399/460 °C. The steam capacity of the boilers was 753,000 lb/hr (94.9 kg/s). The boilers comprised 3 × Stirling; 3 × Spearling; and 2 × Babcock & Wilcox. Electricity output from Stepney power station was as follows.

Stepney annual electricity output GWh.The station continued generation until 1972 and has since been demolished. The coaling jetty in the river remains.

References

External links

 Historic image on Flickr. Stepney Power Station on the right.

Coal-fired power stations in England
Former buildings and structures in the London Borough of Tower Hamlets
Former power stations in London
Demolished power stations in the United Kingdom
Power stations on the River Thames
Port of London